Griesheim may refer to:

Griesheim, Hesse, a town in Hesse, Germany
Griesheim (Frankfurt am Main), a city district of Frankfurt am Main, Hesse, Germany
Griesheim-sur-Souffel, a commune in Alsace, France
Griesheim-près-Molsheim, a commune in Alsace, France